St. Cronan's Church is a 19th-century Roman Catholic church in Roscrea, County Tipperary, Ireland.

References

Roman Catholic churches in County Tipperary
Roscrea